Glenea rufipes is a species of beetle in the family Cerambycidae. It was described by Gressitt in 1939. It is known from Laos, Vietnam and China.

References

rufipes
Beetles described in 1939